The National Women's Football League of Guatemala or Liga Nacional de Fútbol Femenino de Guatemala is the top level women's football league in Guatemala. The league was first played in the 1997 season. Record champions are Comunicaciones with six titles.

Competition format
An annual competition was play out from 1997/98 to 2007/08, when and Apertura and Clausura format was adopted. Now after the regular season, play-offs are played.

There is a constant change of teams in the league, as 13 clubs became insolvent just between 2008 and the beginning of 2011 and had to withdraw from the league.

Champions
The list of champions:

Annual champions:

Apertura and clausura champions.

Titles by team
Number of wins, not including the 1997/98 season.

See also
 Women's association football around the world

References

External links
 Liga Nacional de Fútbol Femenino de Guatemala

Women's association football leagues in Central America
Women
Women's sports leagues in Guatemala